Zubin Varla (born 1970) is a British actor and singer.  He played the role of Judas in the 1996 West End revival of Jesus Christ Superstar, alongside Steve Balsamo (Jesus), Joanna Ampil (Mary Magdalene), and David Burt (Pilate).  This production was staged at Lyceum Theatre, and was recorded in a full-length CD.

Career
Varla was trained at the Guildhall School of Music and Drama and has also performed in West End productions of Cyrano de Bergerac and Julius Caesar. He initiated the role of Saleem in the first written-for-stage production of Midnight's Children at London's Barbican Theatre in 2001-2. He starred as Frederick Trumper in the 2001 Danish Tour of the musical Chess and, along with his fellow cast members, made the only complete recording of the score, the CD of which is now unavailable. He took a leading role in the Silent Witness episode "Cargo" as Detective Superintendent  Vijay Asher. He played Daniel Doyce in the BBC TV adaptation of Charles Dickens' Little Dorrit in October 2008.

In 2009, he played in Shakespeare's Twelfth Night as Feste alongside Derek Jacobi. In 2010, he appeared in I, Claudius as Herod Agrippa.

In 2013 Varla featured as Leo Kamali in the 4th season of Strike Back.

In 2013 Varla portrayed Gustav Mahler in a performance with the London Arts Orchestra.

In 2014 he featured in 5 episodes of The BBC's production of Our Girl as Qaseem.

In 2018 he played Bruce in the off-West End production of Fun Home at the Young Vic and was nominated for an Olivier Award for Best Actor in a Musical.

In 2019 he played a pianist who is obsessed with Theolonious Monk, the Astronomer, the Subway Driver, and the Usher in the Off-West End Production of Dave Malloy's Ghost Quartet in its UK premiere. Due to the complexity of his role, he stated in an interview with the Boulevard Theatre in Soho, where the show ran, that "I suppose I'm also simply one of four storytellers."

In 2022 he will appear in Tammy Faye at the Almeida Theatre.

Filmography

References

External links
 

1970 births
Living people
British male stage actors
British male actors of Indian descent
British people of Parsi descent